Compsopsectra elegans is a species of moth in the family Limacodidae. It is the type species of its genus. The type specimen was from the Philippines islands (Mindanao Island, subprov. Lanao, Kolambugan plains).

References

External links 
 

 
 Compsopsectra elegans at insectoid.info

Limacodidae
Moths described in 1932
Arthropods of the Philippines
Moths of Asia